H. poeppigii may refer to:

 Hibiscus poeppigii, a rose mallow
 Hypolepis poeppigii, a Neotropical fern